Handball at the 2017 Islamic Solidarity Games was held in Azerbaijan from 9 to 14 May 2017.

Medalists

Medal table

Men

Preliminary round

Group A

Group B

Placement 5th–8th

7th/8th

5th/6th

Final round

Semifinals

Bronze medal match

Gold medal match

Women

Preliminary round

Final round

Semifinals

Bronze medal match

Gold medal match

References

2017 Islamic Solidarity Games
Islamic Solidarity Games
2017
Handball in Azerbaijan